This is a list of hospitals in Latvia.

Hospitals in Riga:

Bērnu Klīniskā Universitātes Slimnīca (Children's Clinical University Hospital)
Pauls Stradiņš Clinical University Hospital
Riga East Clinical University Hospital
Hospital of Traumatology and Orthopedics
"Šmerlis" Independent Hospital
Riga City Maternity Hospital
Bikur Holim Hospital (Riga), old and respected Jewish hospital, recently re-opened in the former ghetto outside Old Riga.
Jūrmala Hospital
Daugavpils Regional Hospital
Liepāja Regional Hospital
Rēzekne Hospital
Vidzeme Hospital
North Kurzeme Regional Hospital

References

Latvia
Hospitals

Latvia